Sowhan or Suhan may refer to:

Sohan (cake)
Sowhan, Alborz, a village in Alborz Province, Iran
Sowhan, Razavi Khorasan, a village in Razavi Khorasan Province, Iran